The Crimean Federal District was a federal district of Russia. It was established on March 21, 2014 after the annexation of Crimea by the Russian Federation. The federal district included both the Republic of Crimea and the federal city of Sevastopol, both recognized as part of Ukraine by most of the international community. Ukraine considers the area, along with some other areas, as temporarily occupied territories.

Oleg Belaventsev was appointed the presidential envoy, and the administrative centre of the federal district was Simferopol.

On 28 July 2016, the Crimean Federal District, which during its existence was by far the smallest of Russia's federal districts, was abolished and merged into the Southern Federal District, in order to "increase the efficiency of the federal state bodies' work".

Federal subjects

See also
 Ministry of Internal Affairs

References

 
Federal districts of Russia
States and territories established in 2014
States and territories disestablished in 2016
Russian irredentism
2014 establishments in Russia
2016 disestablishments in Russia